Wong-Lau So-Han (born 25 April 1946) is an archer from Hong Kong.

Archery

Wong-Lau competed in the 1984 Summer Olympic Games. She came 47th with 2056 points in the women's individual event.

References

External links 
 Profile on worldarchery.org

1946 births
Living people
Hong Kong female archers
Olympic archers of Hong Kong
Archers at the 1984 Summer Olympics